The Seagull class were built as a class of thirteen 16-gun brig-sloops for the Royal Navy, although an extra 2 carronades were added soon after completion. The class was designed by one of the Surveyors of the Navy - Sir William Rule -  and approved on 4 January 1805. Five vessels to this design were ordered in December 1804; eight more were ordered in the summer of 1805.

Armament
Unlike the larger s, whose main battery was composed of 32-pounder carronades, the Seagull class (and the similar s designed by Rule's co-surveyor - Sir John Henslow) were armed with a main battery of 24-pounder slide-mounted carronades.

Ships

References

Sloops of the Royal Navy
Sloop classes